Chromatin accessibility complex 1 is a protein that in humans is encoded by the CHRAC1 gene.

Function

CHRAC1 is a histone-fold protein that interacts with other histone-fold proteins to bind DNA in a sequence-independent manner. These histone-fold protein dimers combine within larger enzymatic complexes for DNA transcription, replication, and packaging.

References

Further reading